Raharney GAA is a Gaelic Athletic Association club located in the village of Raharney in County Westmeath, Ireland.  The club is almost exclusively concerned with the game of hurling.

Hurling

Westmeath Senior Hurling Championships:
 1913, 1914, 1919, 1967, 1973, 1984, 1992, 1994, 2006, 2008, 2010, 2014, 2016 2021

References

https://www.advertiser.ie/athlone/article/32481/late-rally-sees-raharney-crowned-county-champs-in-thriller

External links
Raharney GAA site

Gaelic games clubs in County Westmeath
Hurling clubs in County Westmeath